Feuerbach may also refer to:

People
Ludwig Feuerbach (1804–1872), German philosopher and anthropologist
Paul Johann Anselm Ritter von Feuerbach, the great German jurist
Anselm Feuerbach, the German classicist painter
Feuerbach (surname)

Places
Feuerbach (Kandern), a location of the Battle of Schliengen (1796)
Feuerbach (Neckar), a river of Germany
Stuttgart-Feuerbach, a district of the city of Stuttgart